The Hunan–Guangxi railway or Xianggui railway, is a mostly electrified railroad in southern China that connects Hunan province and the Guangxi Zhuang Autonomous Region.  The shortform name of the line, Xianggui, is named after the Chinese short names of Hunan, Xiang and Guangxi, Gui.  The line runs   from Hengyang in Hunan to Friendship Pass on Guangxi's border with Vietnam.  Major cities along route include Hengyang, Yongzhou, Guilin, Liuzhou, Nanning, Pingxiang, and Friendship Pass.

History
The original single-track Xianggui Line was built in sections from 1937 to 1939 and 1950–1955.

The expansion project was completed in December 2013. The new double-track from Hengyang to Liuzhou is called the Hengyang–Liuzhou intercity railway and the new double-track from Liuzhou to Nanning is called the Liuzhou–Nanning intercity railway.

, the southernmost section of the Xianggui Line, from Nanning to Pingxiang on the Vietnamese border, is undergoing capacity expansion to accommodate high-speed trains.

Passenger service

The Hunan–Guangxi railway is used by most trains traveling from Beijing, Shanghai, and other points in eastern China to Guangxi (Guilin, Nanning) and to the Vietnamese border. This includes the Beijing–Nanning–Hanoi through train.

At the end of 2013, high-speed passenger service was introduced on the Hunan–Guangxi railway as well. A direct G-series trains from Beijing makes it to Guilin in about 10.5 hours. D-series trains continue from Guilin to Nanning, taking less than 3 hours for the trip.

Rail connections

Hengyang: Beijing–Guangzhou railway
Yongzhou: Luoyang–Zhanjiang railway
Liuzhou: Jiaozuo–Liuzhou railway, Guizhou–Guangxi railway
Litang Township: Litang–Zhanjiang railway, Litang–Qinzhou railway
Nanning: Nanning–Kunming railway; branch line to Qinzhou and Beihai
Pingxiang: Hanoi–Đồng Đăng Railway

See also

 List of railways in China

References

Railway lines in China
Rail transport in Hunan
Rail transport in Guangxi
Railway lines opened in 1939